Joy Haslam Calico is an American musicologist, and Cornelius Vanderbilt Professor of Musicology, at Vanderbilt University.

Life 
She graduated from Baylor University, University of Illinois, and Duke University. She was a Frederick Burkhardt Residential Fellow at Radcliffe Institute for Advanced Study.

Works 

 Brecht at the Opera (California, 2008)  
 Schoenberg's 'A Survivor from Warsaw' in Postwar Europe (California, 2014)

References 

Living people
American musicologists
Baylor University alumni
University of Illinois alumni
Duke University alumni
Vanderbilt University faculty
Year of birth missing (living people)